is the 37th single by Japanese entertainer Miho Nakayama. Written by Takuro and Nakayama, the single was released on April 8, 1998, by King Records.

Background and release 
Production of "Love Clover" began when Glay guitarist Takuro recorded a demo and Nakayama answered a request for a female singer to do the vocals. As Glay was busy producing their fifth album Pure Soul, the vocals and instrumentals were recorded at separate studios, with Nakayama and Takuro communicating through telephone and fax exchanges. Glay lead vocalist Teru has an uncredited role on backing vocals. The song was used as the ending theme of the NTV variety show .

"Love Clover" peaked at No. 14 on Oricon's weekly singles chart and sold over 38,000 copies. It was also Nakayama's last single to be certified Gold by the RIAJ.

Track listing

Charts

Certification

References

External links

1998 singles
1998 songs
Japanese-language songs
Miho Nakayama songs
King Records (Japan) singles